Miss Earth United States 2016 is the 12th edition of  Miss Earth United States pageant that was held at Rachel M. Schlesinger Concert Hall in Alexandria, Virginia. Brittany Payne of California crowned her successor Corrin Stellakis of New York as Miss Earth United States 2016. Stellakis represented the United States in the Miss Earth 2016 pageant in the Philippines.

The pageant was the 1st edition under US Earth Productions headed by the new national director, Laura Clark. The pageant held its pre-pageant activities in Washington, D.C. prior to the crowning event.

The crowning moment became popular due to a wardrobe malfunction and the oversized crown. Video of the crowning has reached over 18 million views.

Results

Placements

Awards

Candidates
Listed below are 42 contestants from various states and  geographical regions have competed for the title:

Non-participating states
 
 
 
 
 
 
 
 
 
 
  - Karen Reyes

Judges
The judges for the pageant were:
 Alyz Henrich – Miss Earth 2013 from Venezuela
 Shauntay Hinton – Miss USA 2002
 Stephanie McGrane – Queen of Operations, The Pageant Planet
 John Morris – 2015 Pageant Fitness Trainer of the Year
 Teresa Scanlan – Miss America 2011
 Stephen Smith – CEO of Planet Beach Spa
 Thiessa Sickert – Miss Earth – Fire 2015 from Brazil
Jessica Trisko-Darden, PhD – Miss Earth 2007 from Canada

References

External links
 

Miss Earth United States
August 2016 events in the United States
2016 beauty pageants
Beauty pageants in the United States
2016 in Washington, D.C.